Mickelopteris is a genus of ferns in the subfamily Cheilanthoideae of the family Pteridaceae with a single species Mickelopteris cordata. Synonyms include Parahemionitis cordata and Hemionitis cordata Roxb. ex Hook. & Grev. The species is native to south-eastern Asia, from India to Taiwan and the Philippines.

The genus name "Parahemionitis" was initially published for M. cordata, but is not accepted by all sources.

Description
Mickelopteris cordata grows from short erect rhizomes covered with brownish narrow scales. The fronds are of two types. Fertile (spore-bearing) fronds have stipes (stalks) that are usually much longer than those of sterile fronds. It is held at an angle to the stipe. Fronds are brownish green on the upper side, brown on the lower side.

Taxonomy
The nomenclature and taxonomy of the species is somewhat tangled. A species of fern native to the Indian subcontinent and other parts of tropical Asia was described in 1828 as Hemionitis cordata. This name was later considered to be a (heterotypic) synonym of Hemionitis arifolia. As this was an older name, being based on Asplenium arifolium published in 1768, the species was known as Hemionitis arifolia. In 1974, John T. Mickel considered that the species he called Hemionitis arifolia might be sufficiently different from the other (American) species placed in Hemionitis to require a new genus. The differences included frond morphology and which flavonoids were present. Molecular phylogenetic studies have since confirmed the distinctiveness of the species.

Accordingly, in 1993, Gopinath Panigrahi created a new genus for the species, Parahemionitis. He typified the genus using Asplenium arifolium Burm.f., and called the sole species Parahemionitis arifolia. However, it has since become clear that the original type of Asplenium arifolium is actually a specimen of a completely different species, Acrostichum aureum, which would mean that Asplenium arifolium is not a synonym of Hemionitis cordata. Three alternative approaches have been taken to fix this problem. In 2015, Mazumdar designated a lectotype and an epitype for Asplenium arifolium, and regarded Panagrahi's use of the name Parahemionitis arifolia as acceptable. In 1997, Christopher R. Fraser-Jenkins regarded Panagrahi's genus name as acceptable, but not the epithet, and called the species Parahemionitis cordata. In 2016, Fraser-Jenkins rejected the genus name, and published a new one, Mickelopteris, with the sole species being called Mickelopteris cordata. , the Checklist of Ferns and Lycophytes of the World followed Fraser-Jenkins (2016), treating the species as Mickelopteris cordata, and Hemionitis arifolia and Parahemionitis arifolia as a synonyms of Acrostichum aureum.

, while agreeing that Hemionitis arifolia is a synonym of Acrostichum aureum, Plants of the World Online adopted a much broader circumscription of Hemionitis, and so retained the species as Hemionitis cordata.

Distribution and habitat
Mickelopteris cordata is native to the Indian subcontinent (Assam, Bangladesh, the region of India, Sri Lanka), Indochina (Cambodia, Laos, Myanmar, Peninsular Malaysia, Thailand, Vietnam), south-central China and Hainan, the Philippines and the Lesser Sunda Islands. It is found in damp locations, such as the wet soil and rocks of river valleys in dense forests and shrublands, growing below elevations of 1000 m.

References

Pteridaceae
Monotypic fern genera